Blikk (Blink) is a Hungarian daily tabloid newspaper published in Budapest, Hungary, owned by the Swiss media company Ringier. It is one of four tabloid dailies on the Hungarian market including Színes Ász, Bors and Ripost.

History and profile
Blikk began publishing on 1 March 1994. The newspaper was originally owned by Szikra, but the ownership changed to Ringier in 2004. The paper is a tabloid publication and has no clear political affiliation. The paper is published in tabloid format and has its headquarters in Budapest.

In addition to the Blikk newspaper, other publications with the Blikk name are also available, such as the Sunday edition called Vasárnapi Blikk (began in the late 1990s), the entertainment magazine named Blikk TV Magazin and Blikk Nők, a publication targeted at women, which also includes Blikk Nők Extra, Blikk Nők Otthon & Kert, Blikk Nők Konyha, Blikk Nők Egészség and Blikk Nők 100 recept.

Its circulation was 85,000 copies in 1998. The circulation of the paper was 242,000 copies in 2003. Blikk had a circulation of 265,199 copies in 2009, making it the second most read daily in the country. It was about 150,000 copies in 2013. The circulation decreased to 50,017 in 2022.

See also
 List of newspapers in Hungary

References

External links
 Blikk official website

1994 establishments in Hungary
Hungarian-language newspapers
Daily newspapers published in Hungary
Publications established in 1994
Newspapers published in Budapest